Hedley W. Muscroft (3 April 1938 – March 2023) was an English professional golfer. He played regularly on the European circuit and later on the European Tour when it started in 1972. He won the 1970 Classic International and played in The Open Championship 16 times with a best finish of 18th place in 1967.

Golf career
Muscroft won one important tournament, the 1970 Classic International, where he beat Christy O'Connor Snr at the fourth hole of a sudden-death playoff and took the first prize of £1,000.

In 1964, he was a runner-up in the Swallow-Penfold Tournament behind Peter Alliss, and was also a runner-up in the Gor-Ray Cup, the assistants' championship. He was runner-up in the Bowmaker Tournament in 1965 and 1966 and in the 1966 Agfa-Gevaert Tournament. In 1968 he won the Evian International Open in France. Playing with Lionel Platts, he was runner-up in the inaugural Sumrie Better-Ball in 1969.

Muscroft played on the European Tour from its start in 1972. His best season was 1973. He was a joint runner-up in the Scandinavian Enterprise Open behind Bob Charles and was third in the Benson & Hedges Match Play Championship and the Dunlop Masters. Muscroft finished 13th in the 1973 Ryder Cup points table after a poor finish in the last qualifying event, the Benson & Hedges Festival of Golf, where he was 11-over-par for the last 27 holes. The leading 8 qualified automatically with 4 places chosen by a selection committee. The committee chose the players placed 9th to 12th in the table, selecting John Garner who had had a poor 1973 but had gained a lot of points in 1972. Garner was not chosen to play in any matches in the 1973 Ryder Cup.

In 1991 Muscroft finished tied for 7th place in the Seniors' British Open. He played on the European Senior Tour from its start in 1992 until 2000. His best finish to be tied for 5th place in the 1993 Northern Electric Seniors.

Muscroft was at Moor Allerton Golf Club before moving to the nearby Roundhay Park. Later he was at the Geneva Golf Club, Switzerland and later at Aloha Golf Club in Spain.

Personal life, death
Muscroft's two sons, Duncan and Richard, were also professional golfers.

Duncan Muscroft was born in 1963. He won the 1980 Boys Amateur Championship at Formby, beating Aled Llyr in the final. He turned professional in 1982 and played two seasons on the European Tour, 1984 and 1997. He won the Northern PGA Championship in 1983. In 2006 he tied for the Glenmuir Club Professional Championship but lost to Paul Wesselingh at the first hole of a sudden-death playoff. This performance gained him a place in the 2007 PGA Cup team.

Richard Muscroft was born in 1965. He won the Berkshire Trophy in 1986, by two strokes from Ashley Brewer. Later in the year he played for the Great Britain and Ireland youth team in the EGA Trophy and for England in the Men's Home Internationals. He turned professional in 1989 and played on the Challenge Tour in 1999.

Muscroft died in Marbella, Spain in March 2023 at the age of 84.

Professional wins (6)
1962 Leeds Cup
1964 Northern Professional Championship
1968 Evian International Open
1970 Classic International, Leeds Cup
1982 Northern PGA Championship

Results in major championships

Note: Muscroft only played in The Open Championship.

CUT = missed the half-way cut (3rd round cut in 1972 and 1973 Open Championships) 
"T" indicates a tie for a place

Source:

References

External links

English male golfers
European Tour golfers
European Senior Tour golfers
Sportspeople from Leeds
1938 births
2023 deaths